Corythucha arcuata, the oak lace bug is a species of lace bug Tingidae that is a pest of oaks in the Old World. It is native to the New world, and was first observed in Europe in 2000.

References

Tingidae
Insects described in 1832
Hemiptera of Europe